Łukasz Sierpina (born 27 March 1988) is a Polish professional footballer who plays as a left midfielder for Polish club Kotwica Kołobrzeg.

References

External links

1988 births
Living people
People from Złotoryja
Sportspeople from Lower Silesian Voivodeship
Polish footballers
Association football midfielders
Proszowianka Proszowice players
KS Polkowice players
Ząbkovia Ząbki players
Korona Kielce players
Podbeskidzie Bielsko-Biała players
Kotwica Kołobrzeg footballers
Ekstraklasa players
I liga players
II liga players
III liga players